A Knight's Tale is a 2001 American medieval adventure comedy film written, co-produced and directed by Brian Helgeland. The film stars Heath Ledger as William Thatcher, a peasant squire who poses as a knight and competes in tournaments, winning accolades and acquiring friendships with such historical figures as Edward the Black Prince (James Purefoy) and Geoffrey Chaucer (Paul Bettany). Its 14th-century story is intentionally anachronistic, with many modern pop culture references and a soundtrack featuring 1970s music. The film takes its name from Chaucer's "The Knight's Tale" in his Canterbury Tales, and also draws several plot points from Chaucer's work.

A Knight's Tale was released by Columbia Pictures in the United States on May 11, 2001. It received mixed reviews from critics and grossed $117.5 million against a budget of $65 million.

Plot 

At a jousting tournament in 14th century Europe, squires William Thatcher, Roland, and Wat discover that their master, Sir Ector, has died. With one more pass, he could have won the tournament. Destitute, William wears Sir Ector's armour to impersonate him, taking the prize.

Although only nobles are allowed in tournaments, William is inspired to compete and win more prizes. Roland and Wat would rather take their winnings and leave, but William convinces them to stay and help him train. While traveling, they encounter a young Geoffrey Chaucer, who is also destitute and agrees to forge a patent of nobility so William can enter, assuming the name of "Sir Ulrich von Liechtenstein" from Gelderland. But William is brought before Simon the Summoner and Peter the Pardoner: Chaucer has a gambling problem and is in their debt. William demands Chaucer be released and promises payment.

During the competition, William's armour is badly damaged; he goads Kate, a female blacksmith, into repairing it without payment. He wins the tournament's sword event, enabling him to pay Chaucer's debt. In the joust, he faces Sir Thomas Colville, who withdraws from the tournament after being injured by William, though they exchange a ceremonial pass so that Colville can retain the honour of never having failed to complete a match. The proceedings are observed by Jocelyn, a noblewoman with whom William has become infatuated, and Count Adhemar of Anjou, a rival both in the joust and for Jocelyn's heart. In the final joust, Adhemar defeats William. William vows revenge, but Adhemar taunts him, "You have been weighed, you have been measured, and you have been found wanting."

Kate joins William's party and forges new lightweight armour. In the following tournament, Adhemar and William are both assigned to tilt against Sir Thomas Colville, but they learn that he is actually Prince Edward, the future King of England. Unwilling to risk harming him, Adhemar withdraws; but William chooses to joust against Edward anyway and then addresses him by name, further earning his respect.

Adhemar is called away to the Battle of Poitiers, and William achieves several victories in his absence. William proves his love for Jocelyn by complying when she first asks him to deliberately lose (in contrast to knights who promise to win "in her name"), and then, just before he would be eliminated, to win the tournament after all.

The group travels to London for the World Championship. William recalls leaving his father to squire for Sir Ector and learn to become a knight, hoping to "change his stars". Adhemar has also arrived in London and announces that he is in negotiations with Jocelyn's father for her hand in marriage. William dominates at the tournament, but is seen visiting his now-blind father. Adhemar alerts the authorities to William's true identity.

William is arrested and placed in the pillory, but is defended from the hostile crowd by his friends. Just as the mob reaches its frenzy, Prince Edward reveals himself. He acknowledges William's honour and an ability to inspire his friends' dedication that is in the best traditions of knighthood. Edward then announces that William is in fact descended from an ancient noble family, and knights him "Sir William". He asserts that as Prince-royal, his declaration is "beyond contestation".

William returns to the tournament to face Adhemar in the final match, but Adhemar cheats with an illegally sharpened lance, seriously injuring William. Entering the final pass, William is losing by two lances and must unhorse Adhemar to win. He demands to be stripped of his armour while Chaucer buys time by performing the introduction of William that he omitted earlier. William, unable to hold the lance due to his injuries, asks Wat to strap it to his arm. Finally, he tilts against Adhemar, with his father and Jocelyn in attendance. Bellowing his true name as he charges, he knocks Adhemar to the ground with a crushing blow; Adhemar experiences a vision of William and his friends mockingly telling him that he has been "weighed, measured, and found wanting". With this final blow, William wins the world championship. In the ensuing celebration, as Jocelyn and William embrace, Chaucer remarks that he should write an account of these events.

Cast

Production 
A Knight's Tale was filmed entirely on location in the Czech Republic at Barrandov Studios, Prague during the summer of 2000.

Lances  were created that would convincingly explode upon impact without injuring the stunt riders. The body of each lance was scored so it would break easily, and the tips were made of balsa wood. Each was also hollowed out, with the holes filled with balsa splinters and uncooked linguine.

Director Brian Helgeland says in the DVD Special Edition's commentary that he had intended to show what Geoffrey Chaucer might have been doing that inspired him to write The Canterbury Tales during the six months in which Chaucer seems to have gone missing in 1372.

Heath Ledger's principal suit of armour was made in steel by UK-based Armordillo Ltd. They also created several stunt replicas of this armour, Count Adhemar's armour, and all the jousting armours for men and horses in lightweight, flexible, and nearly unbreakable polyurethane resin.

Music 
The film, which notionally took place during the Middle Ages, is notable for its deliberate use of classic rock songs in its soundtrack. The ten that were credited in the film are listed in order of appearance:
 "We Will Rock You" – Queen
 "Low Rider" – War
 "Takin' Care of Business" – Bachman–Turner Overdrive
 "Golden Years" – David Bowie
 "Further on Up the Road" – Eric Clapton
 "Get Ready" – Rare Earth
 "I Want to Take You Higher" – Sly and the Family Stone
 "The Boys Are Back in Town" – Thin Lizzy
 "You Shook Me All Night Long" – AC/DC
 "We Are the Champions" – Robbie Williams & Queen

In addition, the film's score makes use of the work of Estonian composer Arvo Pärt, his composition Fratres (Brothers) being heard in the scene in which William is knighted by Prince Edward.

Year-end charts

Certifications

Release

Home media
A Knight's Tale was released on DVD on September 25, 2001. The VHS release was delayed by three days to September 28 because Sony took down a Spider-Man teaser trailer that was recalled due to the September 11 attacks.

Reception

Critical reception
Review aggregation website Rotten Tomatoes gives the film a score of 59% based on reviews from 153 critics, with an average rating of 5.90/10. The website's critical consensus says, "Once you get past the anachronism, A Knight's Tale becomes a predictable, if spirited, Rocky on horseback." On Metacritic, the film holds a score of 56 out of 100, sampled from 36 reviews, indicating "mixed or average reviews". Audiences polled by CinemaScore gave the film an average grade of “B+” on an A+ to F scale.

Roger Ebert gave the film 3 stars out of 4 and argued that the anachronisms made little difference, writing that the director himself "pointed out that an orchestral score would be equally anachronistic, since orchestras hadn't been invented in the 1400s." In an obituary for David Bowie, culture critic Anthony Lane referred to the film's use of the song "Golden Years" as "the best and most honest use of anachronism that I know of."

Newsweek revealed in June 2001 that print ads contained glowing comments from a film reviewer who did not exist for at least four films released by Columbia Pictures, including A Knight's Tale and The Animal (2001). The fake critic was named David Manning and was created by a Columbia employee who worked in the advertising department. "Manning" was fraudulently presented as a reviewer for The Ridgefield Press, a small Connecticut weekly.

Box office 
A Knight's Tale made $16.5 million during its opening weekend, ranking in second place behind The Mummy Returns. The film earned $56.6 million at the North American box office and an additional $60.9 million internationally, for a worldwide total of $117.5 million.

Awards 
The film was nominated for three awards at the 2002 MTV Movie Awards. Shannyn Sossamon was nominated for Breakthrough Female performance, losing to Mandy Moore in A Walk to Remember. The film was also nominated for Best Kiss, and Best Musical Sequence, losing to American Pie 2 and Moulin Rouge!, respectively.

See also 
 List of historical period drama films

References

External links 

 
 
 
 
 

2000s English-language films
2000s American films
2001 comedy films
2001 films
2001 action films
2000s adventure films
American action adventure films
Columbia Pictures films
Films about competitions
Films set in France
Films set in London
Films set in the 14th century
Films shot in the Czech Republic
Films scored by Carter Burwell
Films directed by Brian Helgeland
Films with screenplays by Brian Helgeland
Edward the Black Prince
Escape Artists films